An election to the Carmarthenshire County Council was held in April 1958. It was preceded by the 1955 election and followed, by the 1961 election.

Overview of the result

A close run election resulted in Labour narrowly regaining control of the authority. The Carmarthen Journal bemoaned the lack of organization amongst the Independents, compared with Labour and referred to the haphazard methods of nomination, particularly in rural areas. Labour took all nine aldermanic vacancies.

Boundary changes

There were no boundary changes at this election.

Retiring aldermen

A number of retiring councilors stood down to allow retiring aldermen to be returned unopposed. These included a Plaid Cymru councilor at Ammanford in favour of retiring Labour alderman, John Harries.

Unopposed returns

There were more unopposed returns than in any previous election, according to one local newspaper. In Llanelli, where many wards had been closely contested at previous county elections, Labour candidates were returned unopposed in all nine divisions. These included the No.1 Ward which had been held by an Independent in the previous council.

Contested elections

In the few contests that took place very few seats changed hands. In Carmarthen, an Independent councilor was defeated by a Ratepayer candidate.

Summary of results
59 councillors were elected.

Ward results

Abergwili

Ammanford No.1

Ammanford No.2

Berwick

Burry Port East

Burry Port West

Caio

Carmarthen Division 1

Carmarthen Division 2

Carmarthen Division 3

Cenarth

Cilycwm

Conwil

Cwmamman

Felinfoel

Hengoed

Kidwelly

Laugharne

Llanarthney

Llanboidy

Llandebie North

Llandebie South

Llandilo Rural

Llandilo Urban

Llandovery

Llandyssilio

Llanedy

Llanegwad

Llanelly Division.1

Llanelly Division 2

Llanelly Division 3

Llanelly Division 4

Llanelly Division 5

Llanelly Division 6

Llanelly Division 7

Llanelly Division 8

Llanelly Division 9

Llanfihangel Aberbythych

Llanfihangel-ar-Arth

Llangadog

Llangeler

Llangendeirne

Llangennech

Llangunnor

Llanon

Llansawel

Llanstephan

Llanybyther

Myddfai

Pembrey

Pontyberem

Quarter Bach

Rhydcymerau

St Clears

St Ishmaels

Trelech

Trimsaran

Westfa

Whitland

Election of aldermen

In addition to the 59 councillors the council consisted of 19 county aldermen. Aldermen were elected by the council, and served a six-year term. Following the elections, the majority of the aldermanic vacancies were taken by Labour.

By-elections
Following the selection of aldermen the following by-elections were held.

Ammanford No.1 by-election

Ammanford No.2 by-election

Hengoed by-election

Llandybie North by-election

Llanelly No.2 by-election

Llanelly No.7 by-election

References

1958
1958 Welsh local elections